Kyme may refer to:
Any of several ancient Greek cities (Greek Κύμη, also spelled Kymē, Cyme, Cuma or Cumae):
 Kyme (Italy) (Cumae, an ancient Greek colony near Naples)
 Kyme (Aeolis)
 Kyme (Euboea) (modern Kymi)
 Kyme Priory, a priory in South Kyme, Lincolnshire
 Kyme Castle, a medieval estate, in Newton Kyme, Yorkshire
 Kyme (actress), an American TV actor
 John Kyme (disambiguation)